Rodrigo Abasolo (born 28 May 1963) is a Chilean rower. He competed in the men's eight race at the 1984 Summer Olympics.

References

1963 births
Living people
Rowers at the 1984 Summer Olympics
Chilean male rowers
Olympic rowers of Chile
Pan American Games medalists in rowing
Pan American Games silver medalists for Chile
Rowers at the 1983 Pan American Games
20th-century Chilean people